Pierluigi Pairetto (born 15 July 1952 in Turin) is an Italian former football referee. Among the many prestigious games he officiated were the Euro 96 final between Germany and the Czech Republic at Wembley, and the classic USA 94 second-round clash between Romania and Argentina in Pasadena.

He held the position of Italian vice chairman of the UEFA Referees Committee until the summer of 2006, when it was discovered that he had been in regular telephone contact with Juventus F.C. chief executive Luciano Moggi regarding which referees would be selected for Juventus' UEFA Champions League fixtures. As a result of his involvement in this scandal, he initially received a ban of two years and six months from football, although this was later increased to three and a half years.

References

External links
 Jonathan O'Brien, The Sunday Business Post, 16 July 2006, "The Italian Job"

1952 births
Italian football referees
UEFA Champions League referees
FIFA World Cup referees
Living people
People involved in the 2006 Italian football scandal
1994 FIFA World Cup referees
UEFA Euro 1992 referees
UEFA Euro 1996 referees
UEFA European Championship final referees
Sportspeople from Turin